Gallium(III) bromide (GaBr3) is a chemical compound, and one of four gallium trihalides.

Introduction
Gallium(III) bromide is, at room temperature and atmospheric pressure, a white, crystalline powder which reacts favorably and exothermically with water.  Solid gallium tribromide is stable at room temperature and can be found primarily in its dimeric form.  GaBr3 can form an intermediate halide, Ga2Br7; however, this is not as common as with GaCl3.  It is a member of the gallium trihalide group and is similar to GaCl3, and GaI3, but not GaF3, in its preparation and uses.  GaBr3 is a milder Lewis acid than AlBr3, and has more versatile chemistry due to the comparative ease of reducing gallium, but is more reactive than GaCl3.

GaBr3 is similar spectroscopically to aluminum, indium, and thallium trihalides excluding trifluorides.

Preparation
One method of preparing GaBr3 is to heat elemental gallium in the presence of bromine liquid under vacuum.  Following the highly exothermic reaction, the mixture is allowed to rest and then subjected to various purifying steps.  This method from the turn of the twentieth century remains a useful way of preparing GaBr3.  Historically, gallium was obtained by electrolysis of its hydroxide in solution of potassium hydroxide, however today it is obtained as a byproduct of aluminium and zinc production.

GaBr3 can be synthesized by exposing gallium to bromine in an environment free of water, oxygen and grease. The result is a gas which must be crystallized in order to form bromide purchased by laboratories. Below is the equation:

2 Ga(s) + 3 Br2(l) ⟶ 2 GaBr3(g)

Structure 

The GaBr3 monomer has trigonal planar geometry, but when it forms the dimer Ga2Br6 the geometry around the gallium center distorts to become roughly tetrahedral.  As a solid, GaBr3 forms a monoclinic crystalline structure with a unit cell volume of 524.16 Å3.  Additional specifications for this unit cell are as follows: a = 8.87 Å, b = 5.64 Å, c =11.01 Å, α = 90˚, β = 107.81˚, γ = 90˚.

Complexes
Gallium is the lightest group 13 metal with a filled d-shell, and has an electronic configuration of ([Ar] 3d10 4s2 4p1) below the valence electrons that could take part in d-π bonding with ligands. The somewhat high oxidation state of Ga in Ga(III)Br3, low electronegativity, and high polarizability allow GaBr3 to behave as a "soft acid" in terms of the Hard-Soft-Acid-Base (HSAB) theory.  The Lewis acidity of all the gallium trihalides, GaBr3 included, has been extensively studied thermodynamically, and the basicity of GaBr3 has been established with a number of donors.

GaBr3 is capable of accepting an additional Br− ion or unevenly splitting its dimer to form [GaBr4]−, a tetrahedral ion of which crystalline salts can be obtained. The Br−  ion can be just as easily substituted with a neutral ligand. Typically these neutral ligands, with form GaBr3 L and sometimes GaBr3L2, will form a tetrahedral bipyramidal geometric structure with the Br in an equatorial position due to their large effective nuclear charge. Additionally, GaBr3 can be used as a catalyst in certain oxidative addition reactions.

Uses
GaBr3 is used as a catalyst in organic synthesis, with similar mechanism to GaCl3. However, due to its greater reactivity, it is sometimes disfavored because of the greater versatility of GaCl3.  GaBr3 as well as other gallium trihalides and group 13 metal trihalides can be used as catalysts in the oxidative addition of organic compounds.  It has been verified that the GaBr3 dimer cleaves unevenly into [GaBr4]− and [GaBr2]+.  The entire mechanism is uncertain partly because intermediate states are not always stable enough for study, and partially because GaBr3 is studied less frequently than GaCl3.  Ga(III) itself is a useful Lewis acid for organic reactions because its full d-electron shell makes it able to accept variable numbers of ligands, but will readily give up ligands if conditions prove favorable.

See also
 GaCl3
 Catalysis

References

Bromides
Gallium compounds
Metal halides